Zorica Despodovska (born 20 December 1991 in Skopje, Republic of Macedonia) is a Macedonian handball player who plays for KPR Kobierzyce and for the North Macedonia women's national handball team. She plays on the position left back.

References

External links
WRHL Profile
EHF CL Profile

1991 births
Living people
Macedonian female handball players
Sportspeople from Skopje